The Central American Games were the first international tournament to feature baseball as a medal event, doing so in 1926 and 1930. The event then became the Central American and Caribbean Games, but another version of the Central American Games was established in 1973 with baseball returning in 1977.

Results

Medal table

References

Baseball
Central American Games
Central American Games
Central American Games
Central American Games